Sir Edward Hussey, 3rd Baronet (ca. 1662 – 19 February 1725), of Caythorpe, Lincolnshire, was an English politician.

Family
Hussey was the son of Sir Charles Hussey, 1st Baronet.

Career
He was a Member (MP) of the Parliament of England for Lincoln on
28 May 1689, 1690, 1698, December 1701 and 1702.

References

1662 births
1725 deaths
Baronets in the Baronetage of England
People from Caythorpe, Lincolnshire
English MPs 1689–1690
English MPs 1690–1695
English MPs 1698–1700
English MPs 1701–1702
English MPs 1702–1705